Orthonitrate is a tetrahedral oxoanion of nitrogen with the formula .  It was first identified in 1977 and is currently known in only two compounds, sodium orthonitrate (Na3NO4) and potassium orthonitrate (K3NO4). The corresponding oxoacid, orthonitric acid (H3NO4), is hypothetical and has never been observed.  Sodium and potassium orthonitrate can be prepared by fusion of the nitrate and metal oxide under high temperatures and ideally high pressures (several GPa).

NaNO3 + Na2O → Na3NO4 (300 °C for 3 days)	

The resulting orthonitrates are white solids which are extremely sensitive to moisture and CO2, decomposing within minutes to sodium hydroxide, sodium carbonate, and sodium nitrate upon exposure to air.
Na3NO4 + CO2 → NaNO3 + Na2CO3
Na3NO4 + H2O → NaNO3 + 2 NaOH

The orthonitrate ion is tetrahedral with N–O bond lengths of 139 pm, which is unexpectedly short, indicating that polar interactions are shortening the bond. Since 3d orbitals of nitrogen are much too high in energy to be involved in the case of orthonitrate, the shortness of the N–O bond in orthonitrate indicates that pπ–dπ bonding is likely not the most important explanation for the bond lengths of these heavier anions either. (See the article on hypervalence for a discussion of bonding models)

Other nitrogen oxoanions
nitrate, 
nitrite,

References

Oxyanions
Nitrates